The Joanna Furnace Complex was an iron furnace that operated from  to  in Robeson Township, Berks County, Pennsylvania.  It was founded by Samuel Potts and Thomas Rutter III and named for Potts's wife Joanna. The furnace and its associated buildings were listed as a historic district by the National Register of Historic Places in 1980.

After the Civil War the charcoal-fired furnace was owned by Clement Grubb's son-in-law, L. Heber Smith, a Civil War Colonel who married Clement's daughter Ella Jane Brooke Grubb in 1868. It passed through several hands before Smith took ownership, probably after the war and before his marriage to Ella Jane. It is likely that the Grubbs assisted with the furnace's major technological upgrade in 1889, when Ella Jane was an heiress to her father's sizable estate that year. The furnace continued in operation under Smith until it was "blown out" after his death in 1898 at the age of 61. The furnace was acquired by Bethlehem Steel, who deeded it to the Hay Creek Valley Historical Association in 1979. The ruins have been preserved and are open to visitors.

See also

French Creek State Park
Hopewell Furnace National Historic Site

References

External links

Hay Creek Valley Historical Association - operates Joanna Furnace
 Historic Joanna Furnace:Schuylkill River Heritage Area

Industrial buildings and structures on the National Register of Historic Places in Pennsylvania
Buildings and structures in Berks County, Pennsylvania
1792 establishments in Pennsylvania
Museums in Berks County, Pennsylvania
Industry museums in Pennsylvania
Historic districts on the National Register of Historic Places in Pennsylvania
National Register of Historic Places in Berks County, Pennsylvania